The thirty-sixth season of Saturday Night Live, an American sketch comedy series, originally aired in the United States on NBC between September 25, 2010, and May 21, 2011.

This season also debuted a new animated feature voiced by former SNL cast members, called "Greetings from American America", created by former SNL head writer Fred Wolf.

Long-time announcer Don Pardo announced that he would pre-record his parts from his home in Arizona rather than perform live in New York City.

Cast
Prior to the start of the season, longtime cast member Will Forte left the show after a total of eight seasons from 2002 to 2010. Featured player Jenny Slate was let go from the show after one season. Abby Elliott and Bobby Moynihan were both upgraded to repertory status, while Nasim Pedrad remained a featured player.

Following Forte and Slate's departures, the show hired four new cast members: improvisers Vanessa Bayer and Paul Brittain from ImprovOlympic, stand-up comic and impressionist Jay Pharoah, and comedic actor Taran Killam of The Groundlings. Killam is the second cast member after Kenan Thompson to be a cast member on a Nickelodeon kids' sketch show (The Amanda Show) and the second cast member after Jeff Richards to be a cast member on MADtv.

Cast roster

Repertory players
Fred Armisen
Abby Elliott
Bill Hader
Seth Meyers
Bobby Moynihan
Andy Samberg
Jason Sudeikis
Kenan Thompson
Kristen Wiig

Featured players
Vanessa Bayer
Paul Brittain
Taran Killam
Nasim Pedrad
Jay Pharoah

bold denotes Weekend Update anchor

Writers

In August 2010, Michaels hired Second City Theater writers Tom Flanigan and Shelly Gossman. Heather Anne Campbell, a performer from the Upright Citizens Brigade Theatre in Los Angeles, was also added to the writing staff. Sarah Schneider, a regular writer and performer for CollegeHumor, was a guest writer for the last five episodes of the season before joining full-time for season 37.

Episodes

Specials

References

36
Saturday Night Live in the 2010s
2010 American television seasons
2011 American television seasons
Television shows directed by Don Roy King